Mukhtar Khan is an Indian photographer and journalist. He was one of three photojournalists from Associated Press to win the Pulitzer Prize for Feature Photography in 2020 for his pictures of India's crackdown on Kashmir.

Works
He has extensively covered the conflict on Kashmir conflict, the Earthquake in South Asia  He is working at Associated Press from 2000.

Awards 
He Won Atlanta Photojournalism Award in 2015. In 2020, Mukhtar Khan, Dar Yasin and Channi Anand won the 2020 Pulitzer Prize in feature photography.

References

External links 
 Mukhtar Khan on twitter

Indian photojournalists
Pulitzer Prize for Feature Photography winners
Associated Press people
Living people
Year of birth missing (living people)